Whyte Yarcowie is a town and locality in the Australian state of South Australia. It is on the Barrier Highway between Hallett and Terowie.

The town of Yarcowie was surveyed in 1875. First land was released to settlers in the district of Yarcowie in March 1872. The name is said to be Aboriginal (Ngadjuri) for "Wide Water". The name changed to Whyte Yarcowie in 1929 after early pastoralist John Whyte. The railway station on the Peterborough railway line was opened in 1880, but the railway closed in the 1980s.

The Yarcowie Hotel (formerly the Commercial Hotel) on the Barrier Highway opened around 1881. A second hotel - also then known as the Yarcowie Hotel or Globe Hotel - operated between 1875 and 1893.

The 2016 Australian census which was conducted in August 2016 reports that Whyte Yarcowie had a population of 51 people.

Whyte Yarcowie  is located within the federal division of Grey, the state electoral district of Stuart and the local government area of the Regional Council of Goyder.

References

Towns in South Australia
Mid North (South Australia)